Ukhta (Ukva) is an important industrial town in the Komi Republic of Russia. Population: 

It was previously known as Chibyu (until 1939).

History
Oil springs along the Ukhta River were already known in the 17th century. In the mid-19th century, industrialist M. K. Sidorov started to drill for oil in this area. It was one of the first oil wells in Russia. There was homecraft oil-field in 1920–1921 in Ukhta. Lying on the river of the same name, the settlement was founded as the village of Chibyu in 1929, but in 1939 it was renamed Ukhta. It was granted town status in 1943 when it was linked to the Pechora Railway. To the east of the town is Sosnogorsk, and to the southwest—Yarega. In addition to its rail link, Ukhta also has an airport.

The town expanded in the 1940s and 1950s by use of political prisoners' forced labor (see: gulag).

Administrative and municipal status
Within the framework of administrative divisions, it is, together with four urban-type settlements (Borovoy, Vodny, Shudayag, and Yarega) and thirteen rural localities, incorporated as the town of republic significance of Ukhta—an administrative unit with the status equal to that of the districts. As a municipal division, the town of republic significance of Ukhta is incorporated as Ukhta Urban Okrug.

Economy
Ukhta lies within the Timan-Pechora Basin, an important oil and gas-producing region. The oilfields lie just south of the city. Some of the Ukhta's oil is refined locally; most, however, is piped to oil refineries between St. Petersburg and Moscow. There have been a few gas pipeline explosions at a distance of Eight kilometres (five miles) from the town since the 1990s.

Climate
Ukhta has a continental subarctic climate (Dfc) with long, cold winters and short, warm summers. Compared with areas at a similar latitude in Siberia, winters are less extreme, but still much longer than summer and bitterly cold by European standards.

Notable people
Roman Abramovich, Russian businessman
Dmitri Aliev, Olympic figure skater
Aleksandr Chupriyan, Minister of Emergency Situations 
Olga Fonda, actress
Sergei Kapustin, hockey player
Viktor Alexandrovič Lyapkalo, painter
Eduard Rossel, Governor of Sverdlovsk Oblast
Yulia Samoilova, Russian singer
Alexander Sukhorukov, Olympic swimmer
Arsen Pavlov, former commander of Donetsk Separatist militia "Sparta Battalion"

References

Notes

Sources

External links
Official website of Ukhta 
Unofficial website of Ukhta 
Pictures of Ukhta 
Website of Leonid Tomov. Information about Ukhta 

Cities and towns in the Komi Republic
Cities and towns built in the Soviet Union
Populated places established in 1929
1929 establishments in the Soviet Union
1929 establishments in Russia